William Frend may refer to:

 William Frend (reformer) (1757–1841), English clergyman (later Unitarian), social reformer and writer
 W. H. C. Frend (William Hugh Clifford Frend, 1916–2005), English ecclesiastical historian, archaeologist and Anglican priest

See also
 William Frend De Morgan (1839–1917), English potter
 William Friend (disambiguation)
 William Freind (c. 1715–1766), Dean of Canterbury